Epichorista crypsidora is a species of moth of the family Tortricidae. It is found in New Zealand.

The wingspan is about 13 mm. The forewings are ochreous brown, anteriorly mixed with whitish-grey ochreous towards the costa. The markings are dark purplish leaden, edged with scattered whitish-grey ochreous scales. The hindwings are dark fuscous, becoming blackish posteriorly.

References

Moths described in 1909
Epichorista
Moths of New Zealand